Jim Enright (born 2 November 1954) is a director of pornographic films.

Awards and nominations
1994 AVN Award – Best Director, Video (Haunted Nights)
2000 XRCO Hall of Fame inductee

References

External links
 
 
 

1954 births
Living people
American pornographic film directors